Deh-e Baqer (also Romanized as Deh-e Bāqer, Deh Bāqer, and Deh-i-Bāgar) is a village in Koregah-e Sharqi Rural District, in the Central District of Khorramabad County, Lorestan Province, Iran. At the 2006 census, its population was 461, in 92 families.

References 

Towns and villages in Khorramabad County